Giorgos Sterianopoulos (born April 1962 in Thessaloniki, Greece) is a Greek businessman and president of the Bulgarian basketball club CSKA Sofia. Sterianopoulos became widely known in the Greek public when he tried to purchase one of the most successful European clubs of the 90s, P.A.O.K. Thessaloniki, in 2005. The agreement with the then president of P.A.O.K., Takis Paneloudis seemed to be in the right track, but in the end Paneloudis refused to transmit his amount of shares.

In 2007, after former CSKA owner and chairman were killed in an accident, he took the reins of CSKA, became president of the team and hired Greek/Serbian former basketball legend, Bane Prelević as a Sports director.

External links
 basketball club CSKA Sofia] 

Living people
Year of birth missing (living people)
Businesspeople from Thessaloniki
CSKA Sofia
Greek basketball chairmen and investors
Greek basketball executives and administrators